Cristinacce is a commune in the Corse-du-Sud department of France on the island of Corsica.

Geography
The village of Cristinacce is constructed on a rocky knoll at an altitude of 830m at the foot of the Col de Sevi (1100m), 70 km north of Ajaccio and 35 km from Sagone.  It is dominated to the north by the Capu di Melo (1562m) and to the east by the range of Tritore, culminating at more than 2000m.  The village numbers about 50 dwellings, the majority of which are only occupied during the summer.

The village is surrounded by chestnut trees that along with the pigs, cattle and gardens have supported the essential economy of the region up to the present day.  Tourism, pork butchery, sale of honey, preserves and chestnut flour are the main activities of the region which has benefitted from its inheritance and tourism.

The water wells of the village are very pure and numerous. One of these feeds the public fountain and is reputed to possess thermal values similar to Volvo water.

Many random walks from half to five days can be made around Cristinacce by a couple or a family.

Many artists have lived and still live in the village.  The paintings of one of them, Francoise Leca-Parodi are periodically exhibited in the town hall of Cristinacce.

History
By popular tradition, handed down from fathers to sons, it is said that Cristinacce was created in the Middle Ages by the three Versini brothers, shepherds from Niolo.  They finally quarrelled and two of them killed the third one.  The latter had many descendants and consequently, the majority of the inhabitants of Cristinacce are Versinis or their descendants (since 1830, 19 mayors of the village out of 20 were Versinis.

Up to the 15th century, the “Cristinacces” were composed of seven hamlets, burnt down by the Genoese in 1460 as a reprisal for a revolt instigated by Giovani Paolo da Leca, a minor local lord.  The village was probably rebuilt about 1480 on the same site, as seems to be indicated by a document of 1485 on the reorganisation of the region after several years of troubles.

In the 16th century, the invasion of the Barbarians again decimated the population.  In 1550, during one of these invasions, the neighbouring village of Évisa was pillaged and 80 men seized and taken away as slaves.  One of them, a certain Versini of Cristinacce, miraculously returned to the village after several years in exile.  His descendants have kept the memory of his past.

Population

Administration
List of the mayors of the village of Cristinacce:
 1830-1832 Givan Battisto Versini 
 1833-1839 Simeone Versini 
 1842-1849 Givan Battisto Versini 
 1849-1852 Ambroise Versini 
 1852-1860 Joseph-Antoine Versini 
 1860-1870 Simeone Versini 
 1870-1877 Jean-François Séraphin Versini 
 1878-1891 Dominique Versini 
 1892-1896 Simeon Arrihi 
 1897-1899 Dominique François Versini 
 1900-1904 Dominique François Versini 
 1904-1909 Martin Versini 
 1910-1911 Dominique Padovani 
 1911-1912 Jean Versini 
 1913-1920 Xavier Versini 
 1920-1925 Bernardin Versini 
 1925-1943 Dominique Antoine Versini 
 1943-1945 Dominique Marie Versini 
 1945-1959 Pierre Marie Versini 
 1959-1970 Jean Baptiste Versini 
 1971-1976 Dominique Antoine Camilli 
 1977-1982 Jean-Pierre Filippini 
 1983-2008 Jean-Baptiste Nesa 
 2008-2013 Antoine Versini

Since 1830, 24 mayors have been appointed, and 19 of these had the same family name as the three founder brothers of the village in the Middle Ages.

Sights
Cristinacce church, building started in 1860, bell tower finished in 1901.

See also
Communes of the Corse-du-Sud department

References

External links
Official site

Communes of Corse-du-Sud